is a railway station on the Ōito Line in the village of Hakuba, Kitaazumi District, Nagano Prefecture, Japan, operated by East Japan Railway Company (JR East).

Lines
Kamishiro Station is served by the Ōito Line and is 55.2 kilometers from the starting point of the line at Matsumoto Station.

Station layout
Kamishiro Station consists of a one ground-level side platform and one island platform serving three tracks, connected by a footbridge. The station is a  Kan'i itaku station.

Platforms

History
The station opened on 25 October 1930. With the privatization of Japanese National Railways (JNR) on 1 April 1987, the station came under the control of JR East.

Passenger statistics
In fiscal 2015, the station was used by an average of 48 passengers daily (boarding passengers only).

Surrounding area

See also
 List of railway stations in Japan

References

External links

  

Railway stations in Nagano Prefecture
Ōito Line
Railway stations in Japan opened in 1930
Stations of East Japan Railway Company
Hakuba, Nagano